Shorea macrantha is a species of plant in the family Dipterocarpaceae. It is a tree found in Sumatra, Peninsular Malaysia and Borneo. It is threatened by habitat loss.

References

macrantha
Trees of Sumatra
Trees of Peninsular Malaysia
Trees of Borneo
Taxonomy articles created by Polbot